Asian Journal of Social Science (AJSS) is a hybrid open access quarterly peer-reviewed academic journal published by Elsevier Science on behalf of the Department of Sociology, National University of Singapore, covering Asian studies, ranging from sociology, anthropology, cultural studies, economics, geography, history, political science, and psychology. In addition to research papers, it also publishes book reviews, research notes, and short essays. AJSS was published by BRILL Publishers before 2021. The editors-in-chief of this journal are Joonmo Son and Eric C. Thompson. 

This journal was established in 1968 and is abstracted and indexed by Social Sciences Citation Index and Scopus. According to the Journal Citation Reports, the journal has a 2021 impact factor of 0.694.

References

External links

Asian studies journals
English-language journals
Publications established in 1968

Elsevier academic journals
Hybrid open access journals